Suralpady also known as Badagulipady is a suburban town located in Mangalore City of Dakshina Kannada district in the state of Karnataka, India. Suralpady lies between Moodbidri & Mangalore city in National highway 169 (Old no NH-13). The town is 13.6 km away from Mangalore International Airport, 19.9 km from Mangalore Central Railway Station, 21.8 km from Mangalore old Port and 25.9 km from New Mangalore port.

Suralpady Comes under Ganjimutt Grama Panchayat. Efforts are being made to include this town into Mangalore City Corporation. The State department of Industries & Commerce has approved setting up of Plastic Park in Ganjimutt which is 2.4 km away from Suralpady with estimated cost of INR 152 Crore in a 104acres of land against 61 acres available now. 32 companies have registered to setup their units there.

Due to the geographic location close to airport Mangalore International Airport, city and industrial area the land prices are soaring high, as much as Rs.5 Lakhs per cent.

The geographical location of Suralpady is 12°58’09.5" N 74°56’28.6" E and it is situated approximately 100 meters above sea level.

Demographics 
As of 2011 Census, Suralpady has total population of 7062 with almost equal sex ratio of male & female. Male population was 3355 and female population was 3707. The male & female literacy rate are equal as well.

Constituency 
Suralpady comes under Mangalore City – North constituency of Legislative Assembly formerly known as Surathkal Constituency. Bharath Shetty Y (BJP) is elected as MLA from this Constituency from 2018 till 2023.

Suralpady comes under Dakshina Kannada (Lok Sabha Constituency) with Nalin Kumar Kateel (BJP) as elected Member of Parliament (MP) from 2019 to 2024.

Religious place 
 Malharul Awakif Jumma Masjid, Suralpady    
 Masjid Thouheed, Suralpady
 Masjid Ayesha, Suralpady
Masjid Abubakker, Suralpady
Rahmaniya Jumma Masjid, Suralpady

Educational institutions 
 Noorul Uloom Madrasa
 Al-Khair Islamic English Medium School
 Government Higher Primary School
 AKU English Medium Public School
 AKU Urdu High School
 AKU Pre-University Women's College

Social organizations 
 Challenger Friends Circle (CFC)
 Suralpady Friends Associated Trust (SFA)
 Irshadul Muslimeen Youth Association (IMYA)
 Helping Hands Suralpady
 Shubada

References 

Villages in Dakshina Kannada district
Localities in Mangalore